Sir Hyde Parker, 8th Baronet (1785 – 21 March 1856) was a British Tory politician.

He was elected to the House of Commons at the 1832 general election as one of the two members of parliament (MPs) for the newly created Western division of Suffolk.  He did not stand again at the 1835 general election. He was appointed High Sheriff of Suffolk in 1837.

References

1785 births
1856 deaths
High Sheriffs of Suffolk
UK MPs 1832–1835
Tory MPs (pre-1834)
Conservative Party (UK) MPs for English constituencies
Baronets in the Baronetage of England